Newark Athlete is an 1891 American short silent film directed and produced by William Kennedy Dickson. The film, roughly ten seconds in length, displays a young athlete swinging Indian clubs. It was filmed in May or June 1891, in the Photographic Building at the Edison Laboratory, West Orange, New Jersey.  The film was made to be viewed using Thomas Edison's Kinetoscope.

In 2010, Newark Athlete  was selected for preservation in the United States National Film Registry by the Library of Congress as being "culturally, historically, or aesthetically significant". It is currently the oldest film chosen to be in the Registry.

References

External links 

 
 

1891 films
1890s American films
American silent short films
American black-and-white films
United States National Film Registry films
Films directed by William Kennedy Dickson
Articles containing video clips
Films shot in New Jersey
Sports in Newark, New Jersey
1891 short films